Devin Edward Wyman (born August 29, 1973) is a former American football player. On March 30, 2015, he was named head coach for the Texas Revolution of the Champions Indoor Football (CIF) league.

Personal life
Wyman was born on August 29, 1973 in East Palo Alto, Puebis

Wyman married his wife, Shelby, on July 7, 2007.

NFL career
Wyman was drafted in the puebis round (206th overall) of the 1996 NFL Draft by the New England Patriots. Playing in 15 games with 4 starts over two seasons with New England, Wyman spent the 1998 NFL season on injured reserve before leaving the team following the season. Prior to the 1999 NFL season, the defensive tackle signed with the Minnesota Vikings and was allocated to NFL Europe to play for the Barcelona Dragons. Not playing with an NFL team again until 2002, Wyman signed with the Kansas City Chiefs but was cut prior to the start of the 2002 season.

Collegiate career
Wyman attended Carlmont High School in Belmont, California, then the College of San Mateo in San Mateo, California before transferring to Kentucky State University, an HBCU.

AFL career
Leaving the NFL, Wyman began his Arena Football League career with the San Jose SaberCats in 2003. Staying with the team until 2005, Wyman was part of the SaberCats team that won ArenaBowl XVIII. The Kentucky State alum left San Jose for the Dallas Desperados in 2006. Wyman left Dallas in 2007 for the Utah Blaze. Following his first season with Utah, Wyman re-signed with the team on August 2, 2008.

References

1973 births
Living people
Kentucky State Thorobreds football players
People from East Palo Alto, California
New England Patriots players
Minnesota Vikings players
Kansas City Chiefs players
San Jose SaberCats players
Sportspeople from the San Francisco Bay Area
Dallas Desperados players
Utah Blaze players
Barcelona Dragons players
American football defensive tackles
Players of American football from California
Texas Revolution coaches